Kirsten Running-Marquardt (born July 6, 1977) is a Democratic Iowa State Representative, elected to represent the 33rd District in the Iowa House of Representatives since a special election in November 2009. She replaced Dick Taylor, who resigned in October 2009 to focus on his family.

, Running-Marquardt serves on several committees in the Iowa House - the Appropriations, Economic Growth/Rebuild Iowa, Labor, and Local Government committees.  She also serves as the ranking member of the Economic Development Appropriations Subcommittee.

Electoral history
Running-Marquardt was first elected on November 24, 2009 for the remainder of retiring Representative Dick Taylor's term.  She won the election, defeating Republican opponent Joshua Thurston.  She won re-election in a 2010 re-match with Thurston.
*incumbent

References

External links

Representative Kirsten Running-Marquardt official Iowa Legislature site
Kirsten Running-Marquardt official constituency site
 
Linn County Democrats

Democratic Party members of the Iowa House of Representatives
Living people
Women state legislators in Iowa
University of Iowa alumni
Place of birth missing (living people)
21st-century American politicians
21st-century American women politicians
1977 births